John Ricketts may refer to:
John Ricketts (chemist) (1924–2007), American chemistry educator
John Bill Ricketts (1769–1835), English equestrian who brought the first modern circus to the United States